Kuznechinsky is a rural locality (a khutor) in Popovskoye Rural Settlement, Kumylzhensky District, Volgograd Oblast, Russia. The population was 38 as of 2010.

Geography 
Kuznechinsky is located in forest steppe, on Khopyorsko-Buzulukskaya Plain, on the bank of the Yedovlya River, 53 km northwest of Kumylzhenskaya (the district's administrative centre) by road. Filin is the nearest rural locality.

References 

Rural localities in Kumylzhensky District